"You" is a song by the band Earth, Wind & Fire, released as a single in November 1980 on Columbia Records. 
The single reached No. 10 on the Billboard Hot Soul Singles chart and No. 30 on the Billboard Adult Contemporary chart.

Overview
You was produced by Maurice White and composed by White, David Foster and Brenda Russell. The song also came upon EWF's 1980 album Faces.

Critical reception
Billboard described the song as "a smooth ballad with lush strings and a tight production that make it appealing".  Record World said it "spotlights Maurice White's croon, surrounded by brilliant chorus swells." Stephen Holden of Rolling Stone called You an example of "Bee Gees-influenced pop romanticism". Phyl Garland of Stereo Review also called "You, the (album's) standout." Garland went on to state that "You is every bit as good as After the Love Has Gone on I Am which is saying quite a lot".

Cover versions
Jazz singer Nancy Wilson covered "You" on her 1983 album I'll Be a Song.

Charts

References

1980 songs
1980 singles
Earth, Wind & Fire songs
Columbia Records singles
Songs written by David Foster
Songs written by Brenda Russell
Songs written by Maurice White